Eskikent is a village in the Gerger District, Adıyaman Province, Turkey. The village is populated by Kurds of the Ferşatan tribe and had a population of 117 in 2021.

The hamlets of Kula and Tepebaşı are attached to the village.

References

Villages in Gerger District
Kurdish settlements in Adıyaman Province